Morets is a rural locality (a selo) and the administrative center of Moretskoye Rural Settlement, Yelansky District, Volgograd Oblast, Russia. The population was 652 as of 2010. There are 9 streets.

Geography 
Morets is located on Khopyorsko-Buzulukskaya Plain, on the bank of the Vyazovka River, 28 km northeast of Yelan (the district's administrative centre) by road. Shchelokovka is the nearest rural locality.

References 

Rural localities in Yelansky District